Seen from the River Danube, the Brotjacklriegel is the first high mountain in the Bavarian Forest. It is a symbol of the Sonnenwald region which comprises the municipalities of  Schöfweg, Zenting, Innernzell, Grattersdorf and Market Schöllnach.

Name 
According to legend, the Brotjacklriegel owes its name to a baker, Brotjackl (EN: "Bread-Jacky"), who is supposed to have hidden on the mountain during the Thirty Years' War. However, the name probably only came into being later during survey work by the French under Napoleon when because of a misunderstanding of the Bavarian "Broada Jaga-Riegl" (Breiter Jägerriegel; EN: Broad Hunter's Sill) the name Brotjacklriegel was written down.

History 
As early as 1839 the parish priest and two publicans from Langfurth built the first viewing tower. In 1924 the present 27-metre-high construction was built.

Description 
On the eastern mountainside above Daxstein are overgrown clearance cairns.

At the summit of the Brotjacklriegel is a TV and radio transmitter owned by the Bayerischer Rundfunk and a smaller viewing tower belonging to the Bavarian Forest Club.

Access 
From the Jackl hikers' car park above the village of Langfurth to the top of the mountain runs a roughly two-kilometre-long trail, the Sonnenwald Nature Trail (Sonnenwald-Erlebnispfad ) with 10 stations at which the forest and its inhabitants are explained.

References

External links 

 
 Movable Brotjacklriegel webcam on the viewing platform

One-thousanders of Germany
Mountains of Bavaria
Mountains of the Bavarian Forest
Freyung-Grafenau